Texas Chiropractic College (TCC) is a private chiropractic college in Pasadena, Texas. Founded in 1908, it is the fourth oldest chiropractic college in the United States. TCC was originally located in San Antonio, Texas before moving in 1965 to Pasadena due to increased demands for a larger campus.

Notable alumni
Gerry E. Hinton (1930-2000), a chiropractor in Slidell who worked to obtain chiropractic licensing while Louisiana State Senator . The legislation was signed in 1974 making Louisiana the last state to recognize the profession.

References

External links

 Official website

Education in Pasadena, Texas
Private universities and colleges in Texas
Chiropractic schools in the United States
Educational institutions established in 1908
Universities and colleges accredited by the Southern Association of Colleges and Schools
Education in Harris County, Texas
1908 establishments in Texas